The 1950 New Zealand Grand Prix was a motor race held at the Ohakea Circuit on 18 March 1950. It was the first New Zealand Grand Prix to be held and was won by John McMillan.

Classification

References

New Zealand Grand Prix
Grand Prix
March 1950 sports events in New Zealand